Leonard William French OBE (8 October 1928 – 10 January 2017) was an Australian artist, known principally for major stained glass works.

French was born in Brunswick, Victoria to a family of Cornish origin.  His stained glass creations include a series of panels in the cafe and foyer of the National Library of Australia in Canberra, and a stained glass ceiling for the great hall at the National Gallery of Victoria in Melbourne, which is one of the largest in the world.

Another important piece of work French created was in seven panels, The Legend of Sinbad the Sailor, in 1956. It hung in the Legend Cafe in Melbourne.

In 1987, French completed a major commission for the Haileybury Chapel in Melbourne, including dozens of stained glass mosaic windows of varying shapes and sizes and a large reredos.

In 2009, Earth Creations was hung in the St John's College Chapel (St. Lucia, Brisbane) by the UQ Art Museum installation team, two years after being commissioned . The piece is a stacked triptych.

French's work has been the subject of more than 40 solo exhibitions in Australia, and been part of many group exhibitions outside Australia.

At the time of his death in early 2017, French resided in and painted in his studio in Heathcote, Victoria.

He was married three times, and had seven children and five grandchildren.

A biography of French, The Boy from Brunswick: Leonard French by Reg MacDonald, was published by Australian Scholarly Publishing in November 2018.

Awards
French won the Sulman Prize in 1960 with The Burial, and the Blake Prize for Religious Art in 1963 and in 1980. He was also awarded a Harkness Fellowship in 1965.

In the Queen's Birthday Honours of June 1968, he was appointed an Officer (OBE) of the Order of the British Empire.

References

External links
Biography
Leonard French in National Gallery of Australia
Leonard French at Australian Art
Leonard French, image of 'Tapestry' in the University of Ballarat collection
Leonard French Obituary
 

1928 births
2017 deaths
20th-century Australian painters
20th-century Australian male artists
Australian stained glass artists and manufacturers
Australian Officers of the Order of the British Empire
21st-century Australian painters
21st-century male artists
Blake Prize for Religious Art winners
Australian male painters
Artists from Melbourne
People from Brunswick, Victoria
Australian people of Cornish descent

es:Leonard French#top